Utahn is an unincorporated community and near-ghost town in Duchesne County, Utah, United States.

See also

References

Unincorporated communities in Utah
Unincorporated communities in Duchesne County, Utah